Xystosomus is a genus of beetles in the family Carabidae, containing the following species:

 Xystosomus convexus Erwin, 1973
 Xystosomus impressifrons Erwin, 1973
 Xystosomus inflatus (Schaum, 1859)
 Xystosomus laevimicans Erwin, 1973
 Xystosomus laevis Erwin, 1973
 Xystosomus niger Erwin, 1973
 Xystosomus paralaevis Erwin, 1973
 Xystosomus tholus Erwin, 1973
 Xystosomus turgidus (Schaum, 1863)

References

Trechinae